The 2018 Caterpillar Burnie International was a professional tennis tournament played on outdoor hard courts as part of the 2018 ATP Challenger Tour and the 2018 ITF Women's Circuit, offering a total of $75,000 in prize money for men and $60,000 for women. It was the fifteenth (for men) and ninth (for women) edition of the tournament.

Men's singles entrants

Seeds 

 1 Rankings as of 15 January 2018.

Other entrants 
The following players received wildcards into the singles main draw:
  Harry Bourchier
  Blake Ellis
  Andrew Harris

The following players received entry from the qualifying draw:
  Liam Caruana
  Gerard Granollers
  Gianni Mina
  Luke Saville

The following players received entry as lucky losers:
  Vijay Sundar Prashanth
  Kaichi Uchida

Women's singles entrants

Seeds 

 1 Rankings as of 15 January 2018

Other entrants 
The following players received wildcards into the singles main draw:
  Zoe Hives
  Olivia Tjandramulia
  Sara Tomic

The following player received entry by a junior exempt:
  Marta Kostyuk

The following players received entry from the qualifying draw:
  Jennifer Elie
  Chihiro Muramatsu
  Anastasia Pivovarova
  Wang Xiyu

Champions

Men's singles 

  Stéphane Robert def.  Daniel Altmaier 6–1, 6–2.

Women's singles 

  Marta Kostyuk def.  Viktorija Golubic, 6–4, 6–3

Men's doubles 

  Gerard Granollers /  Marcel Granollers def.  Evan King /  Max Schnur 7–6(10–8), 6–2.

Women's doubles 

  Vania King /  Laura Robson def.  Momoko Kobori /  Chihiro Muramatsu, 7–6(7–3), 6–1

External links 
 2018 Caterpillar Burnie International at Tennis Australia
 Official website

References 

2018 ITF Women's Circuit
2018 ATP Challenger Tour
2018 in Australian tennis
2018